Coleophora pontica is a moth of the family Coleophoridae. It is found in Ukraine.

References

pontica
Moths described in 1984
Moths of Europe